Thijmen (sometimes translated as Thymen or Tymen), sometimes written without the 'h', is a masculine given name of Dutch origin. Notable people with the name include:

Thijmen Jacobsz Hinlopen (1572–1637), Dutch trader
Thijmen Koopmans (born 1929), Dutch judge at the European Court of Justice
Thijmen Kupers (born 1991), Dutch middle-distance runner

See also
Tiedemann, variation of same name

Dutch masculine given names